The Cathedral of the Immaculate Conception, commonly referred to as Ping'anqiao Catholic Church, is the Roman Catholic cathedral of the Diocese of Chengdu, situated on Xihuamen Street, Qingyang District, in Sichuan's capital city of Chengdu.

Description 
The construction of the cathedral started in 1897, under the supervision of Jacques-Victor-Marius Rouchouse, a French missionary of the Paris Foreign Missions Society and the first bishop of the Diocese of Chengdu, who was appointed to supervise the work by Bishop Marie-Julien Dunand. It was not completed until 1904. The English political economist Audrey Donnithorne was baptized at this cathedral after converting from Anglicanism to Roman Catholicism in 1943.

The buildings, including the cathedral, the Bishop's Office and the Episcopal Residence, cover an area of 16,566.3 square meters and have a usable area of 8,508.5 square meters. Built in a cruciform design with a neo-Byzantine façade, the cathedral and its surrounding buildings constitute the Chinese character "" meaning "fear", representing "The beginning of wisdom is fear of the Lord" (Proverbs 9:10). The right part of the character means "rule", which represents the function of this building as a cathedral, as Jesus said in the Gospel: "Amen, I say to you, whatever you bind on earth shall be bound in heaven, and whatever you loose on earth shall be loosed in heaven" (Matthew 18:18).

Mass times 
English Mass is celebrated on Saturdays at 4:00pm. Service in local language is held on Sundays starting at the same hour.

Gallery

See also 
 Catholic Church in Sichuan
 Cathedral of the Angels, Xichang
 Cathedral of St Joseph, Chongqing
 Our Lady of Lourdes Church, Mianyang

References 

Churches in Chengdu
Neo-Byzantine architecture
Chengdu
Roman Catholic cathedrals in China
Roman Catholic churches completed in 1904
19th-century Roman Catholic church buildings in China
20th-century Roman Catholic church buildings in China